Ammonium iron(II) sulfate, or Mohr's salt, is the inorganic compound with the formula (NH4)2Fe(SO4)2(H2O)6.  Containing two different cations, Fe2+ and NH4+, it is classified as a double salt of ferrous sulfate and ammonium sulfate.  It is a common laboratory reagent because it is readily crystallized, and crystals resist oxidation by air. Like the other ferrous sulfate salts, ferrous ammonium sulfate dissolves in water to give the aquo complex [Fe(H2O)6]2+, which has octahedral molecular geometry. Its mineral form is mohrite.

Structure
This compound is a member of a group of double sulfates called Schönites or Tutton's salts. Tutton's salts form monoclinic crystals and have formula M2N(SO4)2.6H2O (M = various monocations). With regards to the bonding, crystals consist of octahedra [Fe(H2O)6]2+ centers, which are hydrogen bonded to sulfate and ammonium.

Mohr's salt is named after the German chemist Karl Friedrich Mohr, who made many important advances in the methodology of titration in the 19th century.

Applications 
In analytical chemistry, this salt is the preferred source of ferrous ions as the solid has a long shelf life, being resistant to oxidation. This stability extends somewhat to solutions reflecting the effect of pH on the ferrous/ferric redox couple.  This oxidation occurs more readily at high pH. The ammonium ions make solutions of Mohr's salt slightly acidic, which slows this oxidation process.  Sulfuric acid is commonly added to solutions to reduce oxidation to ferric iron.

It is used in the Fricke's dosimeter to measure high doses of gamma rays.

Preparation 
Mohr's salt is prepared by dissolving an equimolar mixture of hydrated ferrous sulfate and ammonium sulfate in water containing a little sulfuric acid, and then subjecting the resulting solution to crystallization. Ferrous ammonium sulfate forms light green crystals. This salt when heated ionises to give all cations and anions present in it.

Contaminants
Common impurities include magnesium, nickel, manganese , lead, and zinc, many of which form isomorphous salts.

References 

Ammonium compounds
Iron(II) compounds
Sulfates
Double salts